The Last Stage is a compilation of unreleased Budgie tracks, mostly from the early-to-mid eighties. Many of these tracks were intended to be released on the follow-up to 1982's Deliver Us from Evil, an album that never saw the light of day. The track "Beautiful Lies" was supposedly meant to be included on the album but never made it. It was previously made available on the Budgie compilation album An Ecstasy of Fumbling – The Definitive Anthology.

The sound quality varies from track to track, as each song was at a different level of completion before it was scrapped.

Track listing
 "Love Is When You Love" - 3:25
 "House of a Sinner" - 4:00
 "Same Old Sad Affair" - 3:26
 "Signed Your Own Fate" - 3:51
 "Hard Luck" - 3:44
 "Living with Another Man" - 3:25
 "You Ain't Got Love" - 3:14
 "Renegade" - 3:48
 "Sweet Fast Talker" - 4:25
 "Wait till Tomorrow" - 4:14
 "Rock Your Blood" - 3:55
 "Nutbush City Limits" - 3:17 (Ike & Tina Turner cover)
 "Can't Get Up in the Morning" - 4:29
 "Heaven in Your Eyes" - 3:14
 "Picture on a Screen" - 5:19
 "Victim" - 3:46

Personnel

Band members
Burke Shelley - vocals and bass
John Thomas - guitar
Steve Williams - drums

Additional musicians
Rob Kendrick - guitar and vocals on track 13

Production
Dave Charles, Simon Dawson, Pat Moran - engineers
Mike Brown, Robert M. Corich - remastering engineers

References

Budgie (band) compilation albums
2004 compilation albums
Albums recorded at Rockfield Studios